Kesarin Chaichalermpol is a Thai porn actress who has acted under a number of stage names, particularly Nong Natt and Natt Chanapa.

Her father died when she was about eight or nine years old. She did not finish high school. At 14, she joined the adult movie business. Before that she worked at the salon of her aunt.

Arrest 
Kesarin was arrested by Thai police for pornographic videos released outside Thailand. These videos led to her arrest and prosecution, as pornography is illegal in Thailand. The videos featured her in hardcore porn scenes with Western and Japanese men. It was revealed that modeling and advertising companies, magazines and television programs have offered her six-digit sums for modeling work since the accusation became public. She eventually had to pay a fine, received a suspended 6-month sentence, and was put on probation for a year. Harsh punishment was avoided due to her popularity and lack of public outrage concerning her crimes.

Partial filmography

References

External links
 

Kesarin Chaichalermpol
1985 births
Living people
Kesarin Chaichalermpol